The swollengut worm eel (Neoconger tuberculatus) is an eel in the family Moringuidae (spaghetti/worm eels). It was described by Peter Henry John Castle in 1965, originally under the genus Leptocephalus. It is a marine, temperate water-dwelling eel endemic to Australia.

References

Moringuidae
Fish described in 1965